Jesús Valbuena (born 28 July 1969) is a Venezuelan footballer. He played in seven matches for the Venezuela national football team from 1995 to 1996. He was also part of Venezuela's squad for the 1995 Copa América tournament.

References

External links
 

1969 births
Living people
Venezuelan footballers
Venezuela international footballers
Association football midfielders
Trujillanos FC players